The Rebellion of the Sergeants was a military coup attempt against the government of Phraya Phahon by a group of army sergeants, led by Sawas Mahamad on 3 August 1935, but the plot was leaked. Sawas was executed and twelve plotters were sentenced from sixteen years to life imprisonment.

Coup plot
In March 1935, King Prajadhipok announced his abdication while still in Europe, the new nine-year-old king Ananda Mahidol was still in Switzerland.  A group of army sergeants who in charge of an armory, led by Sawas Mahamad, plotted a revolution plan against the government of Phraya Phahon. The plot started at the 2nd Infantry Division in command of Major Luang Prahanripu, located in current Ministry of Education office. They planned to kill important military officers and government officials, included Pridi Banomyong, and the regent, Prince Aditya Dibabha, to arrest Phraya Phahon and Plaek Phibunsongkhram, and to take over Ministry of Defence Headquarter. They planned to release political prisoners and force them to join the group. In the end of the plot, they would bring Prajadhipok back to the throne.

Crushing
The plot leaked to the government by one of the group of sergeants. The plotters were arrested on 3 August. On 10 August, fifteen plotters were held by the government. The special secret military court conducted trials against around 100 sergeants.   

The court, without a lawyer, sentenced Sawas Mahamad to death, eight to life imprisonment, three to twenty years, and one to sixteen years. Eleven accused officers pleaded guilty.

See also
Siamese revolution of 1932
Boworadet Rebellion
Songsuradet rebellion

References

1930s coups d'état and coup attempts
1930s in Thailand
1935 in Siam
Conflicts in 1935
Attempted coups in Thailand
Political history of Thailand
Rebellions in Thailand